23327 Luchernandez, provisional designation , is a Florian asteroid from the inner regions of the asteroid belt, approximately 2 kilometers in diameter. It was discovered on 20 January 2001, by astronomers of the LINEAR program at the Lincoln Laboratory's Experimental Test Site near Socorro, New Mexico, United States. The asteroid was named for ISEF awardee Lucero Hernandez.

Orbit and classification 

Luchernandez is a member of the Flora family, a giant asteroid family and the largest family of stony asteroids in the main-belt. It orbits the Sun in the inner asteroid belt at a distance of 2.1–2.6 AU once every 3 years and 7 months (1,305 days; semi-major axis of 2.34 AU). Its orbit has an eccentricity of 0.11 and an inclination of 6° for the ecliptic.

The body's observation arc begins with a precovery published by the Digitized Sky Survey that was taken at Palomar Observatory in August 1992, more than 18 years before its official discovery observation at Socorro.

Physical characteristics 

Luchernandez is an assumed S-type asteroid, which agrees with the overall spectral type for members of the Flora family.

Rotation period 

In December 2007, a rotational lightcurve of Luchernandez was obtained from photometric observations by Slovak astronomers Adrián Galád and Leonard Kornoš at the Modra Observatory. Lightcurve analysis gave a rotation period of 4.933 hours with a brightness variation of 0.50 magnitude. A high brightness amplitude is indicative of an elongated, non-spherical shape. Alternative period solutions that give 5.49 hours or longer are less likely.

Diameter and albedo 

According to the survey carried out by the NEOWISE mission of NASA's Wide-field Infrared Survey Explorer, Luchernandez measures 2.475 kilometers in diameter and its surface has an albedo of 0.2399.

The Collaborative Asteroid Lightcurve Link assumes an identical albedo of 0.24 – derived from 8 Flora, the family's parent body – and calculates a diameter of 2.26 kilometers based on an absolute magnitude of 15.4.

Naming 

This minor planet was named after Mexican student Lucero Hernandez (born 1989), who won second place in the 2007 Intel International Science and Engineering Fair for her computer science team project. The official naming citation was published by the Minor Planet Center on 28 August 2007.

References

External links 
 (23327) Luchernandez at AstDyS-2
 Asteroid Lightcurve Database (LCDB), query form (info )
 Dictionary of Minor Planet Names, Google books
 Asteroids and comets rotation curves, CdR – Observatoire de Genève, Raoul Behrend
 Discovery Circumstances: Numbered Minor Planets (20001)-(25000) – Minor Planet Center
 
 

023327
023327
Named minor planets
20010120